Wilfred Wellock (2 January 1879 – 22 July 1972) was a socialist Gandhian and sometime Labour politician and MP.

Life
He was imprisoned as a conscientious objector in the First World War.

He was elected at Member of Parliament (MP) for Member of Parliament (MP) for Stourbridge at a by-election in February 1927, having unsuccessfully contested the seat in 1923 and 1924. He was re-elected in 1929, but at the 1931 general election he was defeated by the Conservative Party candidate. Wellock stood again at the 1935 election, but did not regain his seat.

Wellock was an active member of both the No More War Movement and the Peace Pledge Union. He was a prolific pamphleteer. Wellcock was a vegetarian.

Wellock's work was admired by Aldous Huxley, who stated in his book Science, Liberty and Peace that Wellock and Ralph Borsodi's work constituted a "tiny piece of decentralist leaven" within the "whole large lump of contemporary society".

Publications 
 Wellock, Wilfred (1917). A Modern Idealist. [A novel.] (London : C. W. Daniel)
 Wellock, Wilfred (1921). Christian Communism, etc. (pp. 43. National Labour Press: Manchester)
 Wellock, Wilfred (1922). India's Awakening: Its National and World-Wide Significance. (pp. 69. Labour Publishing Co.: London)
 Wellock, Wilfred (1938). Destruction or Construction-Which? An open letter to members of the Labour Party, (pp. 11. Peace Pledge Union: London])
 Wellock, Wilfred (1943). A Mechanistic or a Human Society?. (pp. 32. Wilfred Wellock: Quinton)
 Wellock, Wilfred (1950). Gandhi as a social revolutionary (Birmingham : W. Wellock)
 Wellock, Wilfred (1951). The Challenge of our Times. Annihilation or creative revolution? (pp. 15. London)
 Wellock, Wilfred (1955). Not by Bread alone. A study of America's expanding economy. [(pp. 16. Housmans: London)
 Wellock, Wilfred (1961). Off the beaten track : adventures in the art of living.
 Wellock, Wilfred (c. 1961). The crisis in our civilisation : reorganisation by industry a key to world peace, (London : Society for Democratic Integration in Industry)
 Wellock, Wilfred. Youth and adventure: on which side shall I enlist?
 Wellock, Wilfred. Power or peace western industrialism and world leadership
 Wellock, Wilfred. Rebuilding Britain. A new peace orientation. (pp. 47. Hallmark Books: London)

References

Further reading

External links 

1879 births
1972 deaths
British conscientious objectors
British pacifists
Labour Party (UK) MPs for English constituencies
UK MPs 1924–1929
UK MPs 1929–1931
English pamphleteers